Charles Andrew Christopherson (July 23, 1871 – November 2, 1951) was an American lawyer and politician in South Dakota. He was elected to the state legislature in 1912. In 1918 he was elected to the United States House of Representatives, where he was re-elected to a total of seven terms until being defeated in 1932, during the Great Depression.

Early life and education
Christopherson was born  in Amherst Township, Fillmore County, Minnesota, to  Norwegian parents, Julia (Nelson) and Knute C. Christopherson. His father came to the United States at age fourteen. He was one of seven children and was raised in the Lutheran Church. He attended public schools. Christopherson moved to Sioux Falls, South Dakota, where he attended Sioux Falls Business College and Normal School. He graduated in 1890 and read the law with an established firm until he qualified for the bar.

Career
Christopherson was admitted to the bar in 1893, and started his practice in Sioux Falls at the Joe Kirby law office He later practiced alone until taking Fredolph H. Melquist as a partner in 1913. Christopherson became active in local issues. He was elected as a member of the Board of Education of Sioux Falls from 1908–1918, and President of it from 1911-1915 and served as president of the board of directors of the Union Savings Association (1912).

Political career
In 1912, he was elected as a Republican to the South Dakota House of Representatives, and served as Speaker of the House beginning in 1915, in his last term. In 1918, Christopherson successfully ran for Congress from South Dakota's 1st congressional district. He was re-elected six times, but lost re-election in 1932 to Democrat Fred H. Hildebrandt. He ran against Hildebrandt again in 1934, but lost by a wider margin. In 1936, Christopherson ran for the U.S. Senate, but lost in the Republican primary to Chan Gurney. He subsequently returned to Sioux Falls full-time to pursue his legal career.

Personal life
Christopherson married  Abbie M. Deyoe (1871-1952) from Cedar Falls, Iowa on November 30, 1897. Her parents were both born in New York State. They had two children: Wanda M. and Charles A. Christopherson. He and his family belonged to the Congregational Church. He participated in the Masons, the International Order of Odd Fellows, the Knights of Pythias, and the Elks. He died in 1951 and was buried at Woodlawn Cemetery in Minnehaha County, South Dakota.

References

External links

1871 births
1951 deaths
People from Fillmore County, Minnesota
Politicians from Sioux Falls, South Dakota
Speakers of the South Dakota House of Representatives
Republican Party members of the South Dakota House of Representatives
Republican Party members of the United States House of Representatives from South Dakota
Candidates in the 1944 United States presidential election
20th-century American politicians
American Congregationalists
South Dakota lawyers
American people of Norwegian descent
Members of the United States House of Representatives from South Dakota